The 2013 Pan American Track Cycling Championships took place at the CNAR Velodrome, Mexico City, Mexico on February 6–10, 2013.

Medal summary

Men

Women

Records
Pan American records were set in the following events:
 Men's sprint (flying 200m time trial/qualifying round): 9"709 by Hersony Canelón
 Men's 1 km time trial: 1'00"349 by Fabián Puerta
 Men's individual pursuit (qualifying round): 4'15"279 by Eduardo Sepúlveda
 Men's team sprint (qualifying round): 43"031 by Venezuela (César Marcano, Hersony Canelón and Ángel Pulgar)
 Women's sprint (flying 200m time trial/qualifying round): 10"744 by Lisandra Guerra
 Women's 500m time trial: 33"272 by Lisandra Guerra

Medal table

References

Americas
Cycling
Pan American Road and Track Championships
International cycle races hosted by Mexico